Justin Cathal Geever (born February 21, 1973), known professionally as Justin Sane, is an American musician. He is the lead guitarist, singer and songwriter of Anti-Flag, a punk rock band formed in 1988 in Pittsburgh, Pennsylvania, known for its left-wing political views. Sane holds dual US and Irish citizenship and lives in Pittsburgh. His stage name was bestowed upon him by friends in Pittsburgh's punk scene.

Biography

Early life
Sane was born the youngest child in a working class Irish-American family, and cites his parents as inspirations. His parents were vegetarians and they opened the first vegetarian restaurant in Pittsburgh, inspiring Sane to become a vegetarian and animal rights advocate. As a boy he saw his parents participate in rallies, and as he got older he participated.

Sane's sister Lucy gave him his first guitar which got him into punk rock and hardcore. The first song Sane wrote was about a young person overdosing, and his second was about televangelists.

Career

In 1988, Sane formed Anti-Flag with friend Pat Thetic. In 1996, they released their first album, Die for the Government. Later that year, Andy Flag left the band as a result of personal disputes. Various band members came and went during 1997 and 1998, after which they finally settled on a permanent line-up consisting of Sane as lead guitarist/vocalist, Thetic as drummer, Chris Head as guitarist/backing vocalist, and Chris "#2" Barker as bassist/second vocalist. In 1998, the band released their second album, Their System Doesn't Work For You.

In 1999 Anti-Flag released their third album, A New Kind of Army, and founded their own label, A-F Records. In 2001, they signed to Fat Wreck Chords after discussions with the label's owner, "Fat Mike" Burkett. Following their switch to Fat Wreck Chords, the band released Underground Network.

Mobilize, recorded shortly after the September 11, 2001 attacks, was released early 2002. Anti-Flag released a split CD with Bouncing Souls seven months later. 2003 saw the release of The Terror State, produced by Tom Morello of Rage Against the Machine. Anti-Flag's first DVD, Death of a Nation, was released in 2004. The DVD includes live footage, three music videos, an interview with the band, behind-the-scenes tour footage, and three montages compiled by the band.

In 2006, Anti-Flag released For Blood and Empire on RCA Records. The Bright Lights of America was released in 2008.

In May 2008, Sane moved to East End, London but he subsequently returned to Pittsburgh.

On March 4, 2009, Sane jumped into the crowd at a concert at the LCR in Norwich to stop a scuffle which broke out and landed awkwardly, breaking his collar bone. This caused Anti-Flag to cancel the remainder of their tour with Rise Against and their upcoming headlining tour of Europe. The same year, a 2 track split album with Rise Against was released, originally given away with any merchandise purchase on the 2009 Rise Against/Anti-Flag/Flobots UK tour.

Equipment
Sane primarily uses ESP and LTD Eclipses, now almost exclusively after becoming an endorser of ESP. In the past, Sane used Gibson Les Pauls as well. Sane usually uses high gain Marshall amp heads like JCM800s, 900s, & 2000s and Marshall 1960 cabs. Sane and Head have used Orange and Hiwatt amplifiers and cabinets on recent tours.

Education
Sane graduated from The Oakland School in Pittsburgh and the University of Pittsburgh, majoring in communications and minoring in political science.

Solo work
Sane has released several solo recordings, such as 2001's six-track EP These are the Days and 2003's Life, Love and the Pursuit of Justice. These recordings generally focus on love, family, and more everyday concepts rather than the politically charged stance of Anti-Flag.

Discography

Anti-Flag:
 Die for the Government (1996)
 North America Sucks (1998)
 Their System Doesn't Work for You (1998)
 A New Kind of Army (1999)
 Underground Network (2001)
 Mobilize (2002)
 BYO Split Series, Vol 4 (2002)
 The Terror State (2003)
 For Blood and Empire (2006)
 A Benefit For The Victims Of Violent Crime (2007)
 The Bright Lights of America (2008)
 The People or the Gun (2009)
 The General Strike (2012)
 American Spring (2015)
 American Fall (2017)
 American Reckoning (2018)
 20/20 Vision (2020)
 Lies They Tell Our Children (2023)

Solo:
Life, Love, and the Pursuit of Justice (2002)
These are the Days EP (2002)
Gas Land Terror EP (2011)

References

External links

Anti-Flag official website
Interview with Justin Sane

Living people
A-F Records artists
American expatriates in the United Kingdom
American punk rock guitarists
American punk rock singers
Fat Wreck Chords artists
Musicians from Pittsburgh
RCA Records artists
University of Pittsburgh alumni
Singers from Pennsylvania
1973 births
Guitarists from Pennsylvania
Irish expatriates in the United Kingdom
20th-century American guitarists
21st-century American guitarists
21st-century American male singers
21st-century American singers
20th-century American male singers
20th-century American singers
Feminist musicians